HUN Party (Mongolian: ХҮН нам, Khun nam) is a centre-right political party in Mongolia. Founded in 2011, as the National Labour Party, the party branded itself as a newcomer to Mongolian politics with an emphasis on human-centred policies, anti-corruption and transparency. In 2020, it holds one seat in the State Great Khural in coalition with Social Democratic Party and Justice Party as Right Person Electorate Coalition. In 2022, the National Labour Party changed the party name to HUN Party and declared the party's political position as Centre-Right.

Previously a minor party without any seats in the parliament, the party started rapidly gaining traction in the Mongolian politics with a variety of factors contributing to its rise, including the merger of the ex-President Nambaryin Enkhbayar's party, which had previously been the third largest in the country, with the Mongolian People's Party (MPP), the split of the Democratic Party, which had been the main opposition to the MPP, into pro- and anti-Battulga factions and the party composition, including its leader Togmidyn Dorjkhand, being widely seen as competent and well-educated. The party performs well among young people in urban areas. Expats also heavily support the party, with over 75% of the expat voters supporting Dangaasurengiin Enkhbat, the party's nomination for the 2021 presidential election.

It is the only party with a seat in both the parliament and the municipal councils except the mainstream two parties: the Mongolian People's Party and the Democratic Party. In the 2021 presidential election, the party obtained the second place with over 20% of the total ballots, outnumbering the Democratic Party as the main rival to the MPP for the first time in the country's politics. With the current Constitutional Court ruling that overturned its 2016 decision to ban proportional voting and the MPP's willingness to increase the number of seats in the parliament through a Constitutional amendment, the prospects of the Hun party looks increasingly bright in the future.

Name 
Originally, the name, HUN, was an acronym for the full name of the party, National Labour Party (translated into Mongolian as Hudulmuriin Undesnii Nam). It is also the Mongolian word for human and person (in Mongolian, plural form does not have to explicit, ie the word hun can be used both as a singular person and as a plural people). However, the 7th Congress of the party decided to drop the meaning of the acronym to reflect the shift in the party's transformation into a centre-right political party.

References 

Political parties established in 2011
Political parties in Mongolia
Centre-right parties in Asia
Liberalism in Asia
Organizations based in Ulaanbaatar
Labour parties
Progressive parties